The Oak Cliff Tribune was a Dallas, Texas, weekly newspaper that focused on the Oak Cliff community.  It ran from 1903 until February 5, 2009, when Mark Housewright, its publisher, shut it down.

Owners 
 Guggenheim
 Buck Walker Brown (1878–1953), purchased the OCT from Guggenheim in 1923
 A group of investors headed by Robert Lunsford (1901–1952) and Moultrie Hale Cornelius, Jr. (1917–1965) purchased the OCT from Buck Walker Browne and DeForrest Kline (1889–1966) in September 1946
 Mark Housewright (born 1948), publisher of the Tribune from September 1997 to February 2009 (11 years, 6 months)

The Tribune Printing Company Inc.
 The Tribune Printing Company Inc. was incorporated September 13, 1946, in Texas.  In December of 1953, Sam Hanna Acheson (1900–1972), who had been a share holder, president, and publisher, sold his shares to others, triggering a realignment in management.  As of December 19, 1953, the shareholders and officers included:
 Raymond Garber Zauber (1917–2001), president & co-publisher
 John N. Patton, Jr. (1921–1989), vice-president & co-publisher
 Moultrie Hale Cornelius, Jr. (1917–1965), vice president
 Ruth McCombs, vice president
 Shelby S. Cox, secretary & attorney
 Susan Eleanor Lunsford (née Fullilove; 1903–1973), treasurer (widow of former share holder, Robert Lunsford)
 Mrs. Ray Zauber, assistant secretary
 Mrs. John Patton, assistant secretary

 As of January 13, 1956, the following officers were added:
 H. Cal Kincaid, vice president & director
 Manuel Conrad DeBusk (born 1914), director (Dallas attorney)

References 

Publications established in 1903
Publications disestablished in 2009
Defunct newspapers published in Texas
Defunct newspapers of the Dallas–Fort Worth metroplex